Balamory is a British live-action children's programme on CBeebies, BBC One and BBC Two and for pre-school children, about a fictional small island community off the west coast of Scotland, named Balamory. Four series were produced from 2002 to 2005 by BBC Scotland, with 253 episodes made (including a DVD-exclusive Christmas episode). The programme was created by Brian Jameson.

To celebrate the show's 20th anniversary, 25 episodes from Series 4 were added to BBC iPlayer on 30 August 2022.

Characters 
There are eight central characters in Balamory. Each character wears a distinctive colour of clothing and lives in a house of the same colour.

 Miss Hoolie (played by Julie Wilson Nimmo) is the Balamory Nursery teacher. She is the main character and acts as a narrator for each episode. Her main colour is green and she lives in a green cottage, the inside of which is not seen as much as the others.
 Archie (played by Miles Jupp) is an inventor who builds zany creations from household objects which are intended to be useful, but sometimes backfire. His main colour is pink and he lives in a pink castle.
 Josie Jump (played by Buki Akib in series 1 & 2, and Kasia Haddad in series 3 & 4) is a fitness instructor at the primary school next door to Miss Hoolie's nursery school. She plays and coaches all types of gymnastics, sports, and dance and is also talented at storytelling through expressive movement and dance. Her main colour is yellow and she lives in a yellow towered house.
 Edie McCredie (played by Juliet Cadzow) is the Balamory Bus Driver. She has travelled all over the world and has a variety of photographs and souvenirs to talk about. She is also an expert driver and motor mechanic, and occasionally gets exasperated with other road users. She has a video camera which has been put to use should the occasion arise, notably in 'The Wedding' and 'Indian Wedding'. Her main colour is blue and she lives in a blue garage/house.
 PC Plum (played by Andrew Agnew) is a Policeman who aspires to be a master detective, but as Balamory is a crime-free village, he mostly spends his time watching wildlife. His main colour is white (despite his uniform being black) and he lives in a white police station.
 Spencer (played by Rodd Christensen) is a painter. He is responsible for making Balamory as colourful as it is, and is also talented with music, especially as his painter's ladder is musical, each rung sounding a different note. He's also the only American living in Balamory. His main colour is orange and he lives in an orange bungalow.
 Suzie Sweet (played by Mary Riggans) and Penny Pocket (played by Kim Tserkezie) Suzie sweets is the joint cafe and shop runner. As she's older than the other residents, she is a grandmotherly figure who loves to tell customers about the items in her shop. Her main colour is red and she lives in a red village shop and Penny Pocket is the joint cafe and shop runner. She is a young woman who uses a wheelchair and has a talent for mathematics. She and Archie are the only English persons living in Balamory. Her main colour is light blue, although she lives in the red shop with her best friend Suzie.

Songs 
In every episode, a selection of songs are played, each depends on the character.

Beginning in Season 3, a new selection of songs was introduced, although the original songs were still used on occasion (except for Play Days). Also, Penny Pocket and Suzie Sweet, who originally shared a song, were given their own songs. Josie Jump's original song was redone with Kasia Haddad, who replaced Buki Akib as Josie.

All characters, with the exception of Miss Hoolie, sing the Coloured House song one at a time per episode. Penny and Suzie have sung this song both individually and together.

The songs were composed by Foster Paterson and Paul Wilson.

 What's the Story in Balamory?' – Title Theme [All 4 Seasons]
 Which Coloured House are we going to? – Transition theme [All 4 Seasons]
 Everybody Everyone – Miss Hoolie's Nursery theme [All 4 Seasons]
 Everyone's at Home Today – Miss Hoolie's Play Day theme (Series 1–2)
 Strike Up the Band – Miss Hoolie's Play Day theme (Series 3–4)
 I'm Archie the Inventor – Archie's theme [All 4 Seasons]
 Great Inventions, Groovy Solutions – Archie's theme (Series 3–4)
 Jump Up a Little Higher – Josie Jump's theme [All 4 Seasons]
 Cheer You Up – Josie Jump's theme (Series 3–4)
 When I Honk My Horn – Edie McCredie's theme [All 4 Seasons]
 Let Me Take You on a Journey – Edie McCredie's theme (Series 3–4)
 I'm PC Plum – PC Plum's theme [All 4 Seasons]
 Follow the Clue – PC Plum's theme (Series 3–4)
 Climbing Up My Musical Ladder – Spencer's theme [All 4 Seasons]
 If You Need a Little Rhythm – Spencer's theme (Series 3–4)
 I'm Suzie Sweet, I'm Penny Pocket – Suzie and Penny's theme [All 4 Seasons]
 Suzie's Cookin' – Suzie's theme (Series 3–4)
 Sort It – Penny's theme (Season 3–4)

Episodes 
A typical episode follows this general plan:

The opening credits show the town of "Balamory" with its brightly coloured houses. Miss Hoolie opens the nursery school, greets the nursery children, and talks about that day's weather. On a "play day" she visits Pocket & Sweet, the shop-cum-cafe.

One of the other characters (who will be the main character of that episode) tells Miss Hoolie about a problem. This character then sings "Which Coloured House Are We Going To?", asking the young viewers to guess which of the Balamory characters will be most helpful in solving the problem. The main character then proceeds to visit several other characters until the problem is solved. Miss Hoolie and the main character provide a summary of the story at each point, and a final recap at the end of the episode.

For example, in one episode Josie Jump has been asked to look after a neighbour's rabbit, but does not know what it needs. She is advised to visit PC Plum, who advises her to feed it vegetables. She then goes to the shop run by Pocket and Sweet to buy rabbit food, and finally brings the rabbit to Miss Hoolie's nursery for the children to feed and pat it.

Each episode of Balamory contains at least five songs:
 "What's the Story in Balamory?", the theme song
 Miss Hoolie's opening song, either "Everybody, Everyone" if the nursery school is open, or one of the two "play day" songs otherwise
 "Which Coloured House Are We Going To?", sung by the main character after presenting his or her problem
 Character-specific songs, sung by the characters visited by the main character

Episode guide 
Series One
Series Two
Series Three
Series Four

Audience 
The programme was aimed at preschoolers. The show can also be seen in a humorous light. The characters in Balamory are somewhat naive and light hearted, often appearing to be children trapped in adult bodies with adult roles. The storyline revolves around simple problems designed to challenge pre-schoolers' minds.

Guest actors 
A number of episodes feature guest actors in addition to the main characters and the nursery children. Terry Wogan made a guest appearance in one episode (The Game Show) as a television director. This episode also featured Greg Hemphill (Julie Wilson Nimmo's husband in real life) and John Altman, who plays Nick Cotton in the BBC soap opera EastEnders. Celebrity chef Keith Floyd appeared in Suzie Sweet's song "Suzie's Cookin'".

Production 
The show was first confirmed to be in production on 20 November 2001, under the working title of Applecross.

Filming locations 
Balamory was filmed mostly in Tobermory on the Isle of Mull, with the exception of scenes at Archie's castle filmed in East Lothian, and other scenes such as the nursery and the Mainland City, which were filmed in Glasgow.

The nursery was part of North Glasgow College in Barmulloch for series 1 and 2, which was then knocked down. In series 3 and 4, the nursery was a custom built set outside the BBC studios in Maryhill.

International airings 
In the United States, the series aired on TLC and Discovery Kids, as part of the Ready, Set, Learn! block from 2005 until 2006. The series also aired in Canada on BBC Kids.

Currently in Ireland, the series airs on RTÉ2 and RTÉjr.

Home Media and Streaming 
BBC Worldwide released many VHS and DVDs of the series in United Kingdom, which each focus on a specific character or theme.

To celebrate the show's 20th anniversary, 25 episodes from Series 4 were added to BBC iPlayer on 30 August 2022.

Cancellation/future 
On 30 April 2005, the BBC announced that it would not order another season of the series, citing they wanted to experiment and create more new programme ideas. The show continued to be repeated on CBeebies until 3 July 2016. By then only the first two series, series 1 and 2 respectively, continued to be repeated as the last two series, series 3 and 4 could not be repeated due to licensing issues from 2013 onwards.

By the time the programme was cancelled, many of the cast were also keen to move on. Miles Jupp, who played Archie, stated that his role caused problems with his comedy career, with parents assuming his routines were age-appropriate and permitting their children to see them. Julie Wilson Nimmo, who played Miss Hoolie, complained that she could not take her children to the local play area without being "mobbed." Mary Riggans, who played Suzie Sweet, died in 2013, having suffered a stroke the year before. Andrew Agnew, who played PC Plum went on to work for Tattiemoon Productions, and direct the children's TV show Me Too! which shared the same similarities in concept as Balamory. Although set in Scotland, it is primarily set in a city rather than a coastal town.

On 30 August 2022, Andrew Agnew and Julie Wilson Nimmo made an appearance on ITV’s This Morning for the show's 20th anniversary year and said they would love to work on a new series.

Live Tours 
The show has seen two live tours that were held in Arenas across the United Kingdom, being co-productions with BBC Worldwide and DC Entertainment.

The first show, Balamory Live! What's the Story, toured Aberdeen, Cardiff, and Glasgow for the 2004 Christmas season. The follow-up show – Balamory Live: Strike Up the Band was held as a farewell tour, and was held in the Autumn of 2005. The cast of the series reprised their roles in the show except for three of them.

In August 2022 Andrew Agnew said that he would love to do a brand new live show.

Awards 
Best Pre-school Live Action Series (nominated) at the 2003 BAFTA Children's Awards.
Best Pre-school Live Action Series (won) at the 2004 BAFTA Children's Awards.
Best Pre-school Live Action Series (nominated) at the 2005 BAFTA Children's Awards.

References 
Balamory Live! What’s the Story

External links 
 
 Press release at the launch of Balamory at bbc.co.uk
 

 
2000s British children's television series
British preschool education television series
British children's musical television series
2000s preschool education television series
BBC children's television shows
BBC Scotland television shows
Isle of Mull
Fictional populated places in Scotland
Television shows set in Scotland
Television series by BBC Studios
CBeebies